Andre Tillman (born November 1, 1952) is a former American football tight end in the National Football League. Growing up he attended Lake Highlands High School. He was drafted by the Miami Dolphins in the second round of the 1974 NFL Draft. As of 2017, he was one of 5 tight ends to ever be selected in the second round by the Dolphins. He played college football at Texas Tech.

Tillman played in a total of 58 games for the Dolphins from 1975 to 1978.

References

External links

1952 births
Living people
American football tight ends
Miami Dolphins players
Players of American football from Dallas
Texas Tech Red Raiders football players